Google Pay may refer to:

 Google Pay (mobile app), a mobile payments app introduced in 2020
 Google Pay (2018–2022), a digital wallet app introduced in 2018, now Google Wallet
 Google Pay (payment method), a digital payments service introduced in 2013
 Google Pay Send, a discontinued peer-to-peer payments service introduced in 2011, formerly Google Wallet

See also 
 Google Checkout, the predecessor to the Google Pay payment method
 Google Play, a digital distribution service